Lygodactylus williamsi is a critically endangered species of lizard in the family Gekkonidae. The species is endemic to a small area of Tanzania. Common names include turquoise dwarf gecko, William's dwarf gecko, and, in the pet trade, electric blue gecko.

Illegal wild-caught specimens are widely sold in the pet trade, often misdescribed as captive-bred. Although L. williamsi breeds in captivity, the young require a lot of care, making large-scale breeding difficult. A captive breeding project and studbook was initiated by EAZA zoos in 2013.

The species L. williamsi was placed under EU Appendix B protection in December 2014, under EU Appendix A protection in January 2017, and under CITES Appendix I protection in January 2017. The gecko may not be kept or sold in the EU without documentation and permits, renewable every three years, and geckos must now be registered. Similar restrictions apply in some other jurisdictions.

Population
The survival of L. williamsi is mostly threatened by (entirely illegal) collection for the international pet trade. It is critically endangered and the population is thought to be declining rapidly.

Although trade in wild-caught turquoise day geckos is illegal, wild-caught geckos are commonly sold in pet shops. It is estimated that between December 2004 and July 2009, at least 32,310 to 42,610 geckos were taken by one collecting group, ~15% of the wild population at the time.

Geographic range
These are located at the foothills of the Uluguru Mountains in eastern Tanzania.

The subpopulation in Kimboza Forest Reserve was estimated at 150,000 adults in 2009. The size of the remaining subpopulations is unknown, but their size is not thought to contribute significantly to the total population. The two known sites outside protected areas are tiny: one consists of 14 Pandanus trees (the rest has been cleared for banana plantations) and the other is equally close to disappearing.

Habitat
In the wild, the turquoise day gecko lives exclusively on the (redlisted endemic) screwpine, Pandanus rabaiensis, mostly in the leaf crown. A single leaf crown will typically contain a single individual, or an adult male, an adult female, and juveniles. It eats small insects and drinks water from leaves. It is also fond of nectar.

Habitat loss
Collectors commonly cut down screwpine trees to reach the geckos living in the leaf crest, destroying the gecko's habitat. Many geckos are thought to die while being shipped to market. The pet trade is likely a worse threat than habitat loss.The gecko is now restricted to the forest in Tanzania and is at risk of extinction in the wild as the forests are cleared.

L. williamsi'''s tropical forest habitat is also shrinking and fragmenting. Neither of the Catchment Forest Reserves where it occurs is well-protected. The forest is seriously threatened by pet collectors, clearing for farmland, illegal logging, increasingly frequent fires, mining of rubies, tourmaline, rhodolite, gold and dolomite and limestone from outcrops on which the screwpines grow. Invasive trees such as Cedrela are also a threat. There is little forest left unaffected.

Appearance

Males of L. williamsi are bright blue with heavy black throat stripes, visible preanal pores, and hemipenile bulges. Females range from brown or bronze to bright green, and have little to no black on the throat. Females can easily be confused with juvenile or socially suppressed males that are also green, sometimes with a bluish cast. The underside of both sexes is orange. Colours of individuals vary according to mood and temperature. Males may range from black or gray to brilliant electric blue. Females may range from dark brown to brilliant green with turquoise highlights.

A Lygodactylus spp. identification guide has been published online by CITES, largely for the use of customs officers (illegal shipments of these geckos are often intentionally mislabelled).

Behavior
Like all geckos of the genera Lygodactylus and Phelsuma, L. williamsi is diurnal. It is bold, active, and social. Males are territorial, and do not generally tolerate the presence of other males. Social gestures include lateral flattening, puffing out of the throat patch, head shaking and head bobbing, and tail-wagging.

Reproduction
Males of L. williamsi court females with lateral flattening, puffing out of the throat pouch, and head bobbing. Two to three weeks after copulation, the female lays a clutch of 1 or 2 pea-sized white, hard-shelled eggs which are glued to a surface in a secure, hidden location. Eggs hatch in 60 to 90 days.

Etymology
The specific name, williamsi'', given to the gecko by British zoologist Arthur Loveridge, honours American herpetologist Ernest Edward Williams.

References

UNEP-WCMC Species Database

External links
The Reptile Database entry: http://reptile-database.reptarium.cz/species?genus=Lygodactylus&species=williamsi
Catalogue of Life taxonomic entry: http://www.catalogueoflife.org/col/details/species/id/13201544

Lygodactylus
Species endangered by the pet trade
Species endangered by deforestation
Species endangered by logging for timber
Species endangered by logging for firewood
Species endangered by agricultural development
Species endangered by fires
Species endangered by mining
Reptiles of Tanzania
Endemic fauna of Tanzania
Reptiles described in 1952
Reptiles as pets